Daniel Iron is a Canadian film and television producer.  After his company Foundry Films was acquired by Blue Ice Group, he became president of production of that company.

Recognition 
 2008 Genie Award for Best Motion Picture - Away From Her - Won (shared with Simone Urdl, Jennifer Weiss)
 2007 Genie Award for Best Documentary - Manufactured Landscapes - Won (shared with Jennifer Baichwal, Nicholas de Pencier, Gerry Flahive, Peter Starr)
 2007 Gemini Award for Best TV movie - Last Exit - Nominated (shared with Richard Lalonde)
 2006 Gemini Award for Best Dramatic Series - Slings and Arrows - Won (shared with Niv Fichman, Sari Friedland)
 2004 Gemini Award for Best Dramatic Series - Slings and Arrows - Nominated (shared with Sari Friedland, Niv Fichman)
 2004 Gemini Award for Best TV Movie or Dramatic Mini-Series - Elizabeth Rex - Nominated (shared with Jennifer Jonas, Niv Fichman)
 2002 Gemini Award for Best Dramatic Series - Foreign Objects - Nominated (shared with Ken Finkleman, Niv Fichman)
 1999 Genie Award for Best Motion Picture - Last Night - Nominated (shared with Niv Fichman)
 1999 Jutra Award for Best Film (Meilleur Film) - The Red Violin - Nominated (shared with Niv Fichman)
 1996 Genie Award for Best Motion Picture - Long Day's Journey into Night - Nominated (shared with Niv Fichman)

References

External links 
 

Canadian film producers
Canadian television producers
Canadian Screen Award winners
Year of birth missing (living people)
Living people